Cyprinus yilongensis is an extinct species of ray-finned fish in the  family Cyprinidae.
It was found only in Yilong Lake, Yunnan, China.  It was last seen before 1981, when the lake was drained for 20 days, presumably causing the species' extermination.

References 

Cyprinus
Fish described in 1977
Extinct animals of China
Freshwater fish of China
Fish extinctions since 1500
Taxonomy articles created by Polbot